is a beat 'em up arcade game developed and released by Data East in 1991. It features the Avengers team of Marvel Comics characters in a side-scrolling brawling and shooting adventure to defeat the evil Red Skull. The game received ports for the Sega Genesis/Mega Drive, Super Nintendo Entertainment System, Game Boy and Game Gear. A different Data East game was released for the Nintendo Entertainment System.

Gameplay
The Red Skull has assembled an army of supervillains and other henchmen in a plot to take over the world. Along with battling generic enemies, players also face Klaw, the Living Laser, Whirlwind, a Sentinel, Wizard, the Grim Reaper, the Mandarin, Juggernaut, Ultron, The Controller, the assassin Crossbones and finally the Red Skull himself.

Players can choose to play as one of four members of the Avengers: Captain America, Iron Man, Hawkeye, and Vision. Each character can fight hand-to-hand, throw select items when on the ground, and use a ranged special attack, either a projectile weapon (Captain America's shield and Hawkeye's arrows) or an energy beam (Iron Man and Vision), known as that character's "Avenger Attack". During a jump, Captain America and Hawkeye can attack with a flying kick, while Iron Man and Vision instead attack by firing their energy beams at a 45 degree angle. Other Avengers, including the Wasp, Quicksilver, Wonder Man, and Namor the Sub-Mariner, appear when special power-ups are collected, allowing those characters to temporarily assist the players' characters.

Most game levels feature side-scrolling fighting, with free movement as in traditional arcade brawlers. Occasionally, players take flight for side-scrolling flying & shooting sequences; Iron Man and Vision fly on their own, while Captain America and Hawkeye use flying machines.

Versions

The original arcade game was sold in two forms. One version allowed four players to play simultaneously, with each player position controlling a specific character. An alternate version featured two-player gameplay, with players able to select from any of the available four characters.

Ports and related releases
Data East released a home version of the game in North America for the Sega Genesis co-developed with ISCO/Opera House. This version was published in Europe by Sega for the Mega Drive. The game was later licensed to Mindscape, who released its own ports of the arcade game for the Super NES, Game Boy and Game Gear. The versions published by Mindscape were developed by Realtime Associates.

Data East also released a different NES game with the same title. The NES version is a side-scrolling action platform game. The only playable characters in this version are Captain America and Hawkeye; their mission is to save the Vision and Iron Man from Mandarin, then defeat the Red Skull. As with the Genesis/Mega Drive port, the NES game was developed in Japan but not released there.

Data East's third and final entry in their Captain America and The Avengers licensed video games was the 1995 Avengers in Galactic Storm, which was an arcade exclusive fighting game that became the first to feature assist characters and duplex desperation moves.

In 2021, Arcade1Up released the game in a special Marvel themed cabinet that also featured Avengers in Galactic Storm and X-Men.

Other appearances in media
An arcade cabinet of the game can be spotted in the 1994 comedy Airheads.

One page of Matt Fraction and David Aja's run of Hawkeye comics directly lifts from the arcade game's artwork.

Reception

Arcade
In the United States, it topped the RePlay arcade earnings chart for upright arcade cabinets in November 1991. In Japan, Game Machine listed Captain America and The Avengers on their January 1, 1992 issue as being the fourth most-successful table arcade unit of the month.

The November 1991 issue of Sinclair User gave it the shared award for "Games Most Likely To Save The Universe" as one of the best superhero games, along with Spider-Man: The Video Game and Captain Commando.

Game Gear
In reviewing the Game Gear version, GamePro called the game "a forgettable scroller" with mediocre animation and sound. Electronic Gaming Monthly said it "fares well on this Game Gear version, even without the Two-player Simultaneous Play Option".

SNES
In 2018, Complex ranked the SNES version 85th on their "The Best Super Nintendo Games of All Time".

Notes

References

External links

1991 video games
Arcade video games
Beat 'em ups
Cooperative video games
Data East arcade games
Data East video games
Game Boy games
Game Gear games
Mindscape games
Nintendo Entertainment System games
Platform games
Sega Genesis games
Side-scrolling beat 'em ups
Super Nintendo Entertainment System games
Superhero video games
Video games based on Avengers (comics)
Video games based on Captain America
Video games developed in Japan
Video games set in New York City
Video games set on the Moon